Dolichoderus bidens is a species of ant in the genus Dolichoderus. Described by Carl Linnaeus in his 1758 10th edition of Systema Naturae, the species is endemic to Brazil, Ecuador, French Guiana, Guyana, Suriname and Trinidad and Tobago.

References

Dolichoderus
Hymenoptera of South America
Ants described in 1758
Taxa named by Carl Linnaeus